Esperança (Portuguese and Catalan for "hope") may refer to:

Places
Esperança, Ceará, Ceará, Brazil
Esperança, Paraíba, Paraíba, Brazil
Esperança (Arronches), a parish in the municipality of Arronches, Portugal
Esperança (Póvoa de Lanhoso), a parish in the municipality of Póvoa de Lanhoso, Portugal

Other
Esperança (album), an album by Brazilian gospel band Diante do Trono
Esperança (non-profit), a non-profit based out of Phoenix, AZ
Esperança (TV series), a Brazilian telenovela produced and aired by TV Globo

See also
 Esperanza (disambiguation)